Rutland, Vermont may refer to:
Rutland (city), Vermont
Rutland (town), Vermont
Rutland County, Vermont
West Rutland, Vermont